Mersin Naval Museum is a naval museum in Mersin, Turkey.

Geography
The museum is located in the Yenişehir municipality of Mersin. It is next to the Mersin Archaeological Museum. The Muğdat Mosque is to the northeast of the museum. The ground area of the building is

History
Mersin is one of the important ports of Turkey. The Turkish Navy decided to establish a naval museum there and construction began on 16 September 2009. The Mersin Naval Museum is the fourth naval museum in Turkey after those of İstanbul, Çanakkale and İskenderun. It was opened to public on 14 July 2011.

Museum
In the  main hall, objects such as uniforms, weapons, historical battle ship models and paintings about important battles and portraits of admirals such as Çaka Bey, Umur Bey, Piri Reis and Cezayirli Gazi Hasan Pasha are displayed. In the interactive display hall the visitors can watch videos of the cruiser Hamidye, the Mahmudiye, the Battle of Preveza and Hayreddin Barbarossa, the minelayer Nusret, and the cruiser Yavuz. Bigger military equipment such as radar, torpedoes, etc. are displayed in the museum's yard.

References

Yenişehir, Mersin
Museums established in 2011
2011 establishments in Turkey
Naval
National museums in Turkey
Military and war museums in Turkey
Naval museums in Turkey